"Teenage Lobotomy" is a song by the American punk rock band Ramones. It was released on their 1977 album Rocket to Russia, and became one of their most popular songs.

The song's lyrics are about a teenager who had a lobotomy because of the brain damage caused by overexposure to DDT. The lyrics also outline how this procedure can cause serious consequences to the brain, with the line "Gonna get my Ph.D, I'm a teenage lobotomy." The composition features more complex melodies than that of other songs from the album, with the album's engineer Ed Stasium proclaiming it to be a "mini-Ramones Symphony".

"Teenage Lobotomy" has been released as downloadable content for the music video game Rock Band.

Personnel
 Joey Ramone – lead vocals
 Johnny Ramone – guitar
 Dee Dee Ramone – bass, backing vocals
 Tommy Ramone – drums, producer

Production
 Tony Bongiovi – producer
 Ed Stasium – engineer
 Don Berman – assistant engineer
 Greg Calbi – mastering

References

Songs about teenagers
1977 songs
Lobotomy
Songs written by Dee Dee Ramone
Ramones songs
Song recordings produced by Tony Bongiovi
Song recordings produced by Tommy Ramone
Songs written by Joey Ramone
Songs written by Johnny Ramone
Songs written by Tommy Ramone